Call Northside 777 is a 1948 reality-based newspaper drama directed by Henry Hathaway. The film parallels the true story of a Chicago reporter who proved that a man jailed for murder was wrongly convicted 11 years before. James Stewart stars as the persistent journalist and Richard Conte plays the imprisoned Frank Wiecek. Wiecek is based on Joseph Majczek, who was wrongly convicted of the murder of a Chicago policeman in 1932, one of the worst years of organized crime during Prohibition.

Plot

In Chicago in 1932, during Prohibition, a policeman is murdered inside a speakeasy. Frank Wiecek (Richard Conte) and another man are quickly arrested, and in November 1933 are convicted and sentenced to serve 99 years imprisonment each for the killing. 

Eleven years later, Wiecek's mother (Kasia Orzazewski) puts a classified ad in the Chicago Times, offering a $5,000 reward for information about the true killers of the police officer. This leads the paper's city editor, Brian Kelly (Lee J. Cobb), to assign reporter P.J. McNeal (James Stewart) to look more closely into the case. McNeal is skeptical at first, believing Wiecek to be guilty. But he starts to change his mind, and meets increased resistance from the police and the state attorney's office, who are unwilling to be proved wrong. This is quickly followed by political pressure from the state capital, where politicians are anxious to end a story that might prove embarrassing to the administration. 

Eventually, Wiecek is proved innocent by, among other things, the enlarging of a photograph showing the date on a newspaper that proves that a key witness statement was false. (In actuality, innocence was determined not as claimed in the film but when it was found out that the prosecution had suppressed the fact that the main witness had initially declared that she could not identify the two men involved in the police shooting.)

Cast

 James Stewart as P.J. McNeal (based on real life reporter James McGuire)
 Richard Conte as Frank Wiecek (based on real life convict Joseph Majczek)
 Lee J. Cobb as Brian Kelly (based on real life editor Karin Walsh)
 Helen Walker as Laura McNeal
 Betty Garde as Wanda Skutnik (based on real life witness Vera Walush)
 Kasia Orzazewski as Tillie Wiecek (based on real life mother Tillie Majczek)
 Joanne De Bergh as Helen Wiecek
 Michael Chapin as Frank Wiecek Jr.
 Howard Smith as K.L. Palmer (based on real life manager K.L. Endecott)
 Moroni Olsen as Pardon Board Chairman
 J.M. Kerrigan as Sullivan
 John McIntire as Sam Faxon
 Paul Harvey as Martin J. Burns (based on real life lawyer Martin J. Scott)
 George Tyne as Tomek Zaleska (based on real life convict Theodore Marcinkiewicz) (uncredited)
 Leonarde Keeler as himself - the actual inventor of the Polygraph (uncredited)
 E. G. Marshall as Rayska (uncredited)
 Thelma Ritter as receptionist (uncredited)
 Lionel Stander as Corrigan – Wiecek's cellmate (uncredited)
 Truman Bradley as the narrator (uncredited)
 Samuel S. Hinds as Judge Charles Moulton (uncredited)

Production
It was reported on January 24, 1947, that, according to the studio, the picture would be filmed in the documentary manner. Fox had obtained the necessary legal clearances from the persons involved in the story and had dispatched Otto Lang, producer, and Leonard Hoffman, writer, to Chicago to gather material for the film. Eventually, Quentin Reynolds and Jay Dratler joined Hoffman in writing the script.

Casting the film proved complex. According to a March 7 report in The New York Times, Twentieth Century-Fox had named Henry Fonda to play the newspaper reporter in Call Northside 777, which would precede Chicken Every Sunday and Lone Star Preacher on Fonda's schedule. However, after a month, another report pointed out that Fox had named Fonda for a leading role in the screen adaptation of Elizabeth Janeway's novel, Daisy Kenyon, which necessitated Fonda's replacement in Call Northside 777. Two months later, another report said that Twentieth Century-Fox was "negotiating for the services of James Stewart for the leading role in Call Northside 777." Lloyd Nolan was originally named to play the role of Brian Kelly, but Lee J. Cobb replaced him in the end. Leopoldine Konstantin was originally scheduled to play the wrongly convicted man's mother, but in the end the role went to Kasia Orzazewski.

This was the first Hollywood feature film to be shot on location in Chicago. Views of the Merchandise Mart as well as Holy Trinity Polish Mission can be seen throughout the film.

Reception

Critical response
The film received mostly positive reviews when it was first released, and again when it was released on DVD in 2004. In 2004, the Onion AV Club Review argued that the film may not be a true film noir, but is good nonetheless: "Outstanding location shooting and Stewart's driven performance turn a sober film into a vibrant, exciting one, even though the hero and the jailbird he champions are really too noble for noir." The website DVD Verdict made the case that the lead actor may be the best reason to see the film: "Its value exists mainly in Stewart's finely drawn characterization of a cynical man with a nagging conscience."

"By far the best documentary-style movie yet... Hands down the most expert, informative, gripping, and develops the most substantial audience rooting interest of them all"---AGER, PM.

"Calls for three cheers from every working newspaper man and, for that matter, for at least two from every moviegoer."---CREELMAN N.Y Sun

Awards
Wins
 Edgar Award: from the Mystery Writers of America for Best Motion Picture Screenplay; 1949.

Nominations
 Writers Guild of America: WGA Award; Best Written American Drama, Jerome Cady and Jay Dratler; The Robert Meltzer Award (Screenplay Dealing Most Ably with Problems of the American Scene), Jerome Cady and Jay Dratler; 1949.

Marketing

Call Northside 777 was advertised by the Valerie Theatre in Inverness, Florida. The manager picked out random numbers from the phone book. If the party called answered by saying "Are you calling Northside 777," free tickets to see the show were given.

The film is recognized by American Film Institute in these lists:
 2001: AFI's 100 Years...100 Thrills – Nominated

Adaptations
For an episode of CBS Radio's Hollywood Sound Stage, broadcast December 27, 1951, Harry Kronman adapted and directed a condensed 30-minute version of the film, casting Dana Andrews and Thomas Gomez in the leads. Tony Barrett, Bob Sweeney, Betty Lou Gerson, and Frank Nelson played supporting roles.

The April 17, 1951, audition episode of the radio program Defense Attorney (then titled Defense Rests) starring Mercedes McCambridge was based on the same plot, with some modifications.

Indian Hindi film Post Box 999 (1958) directed by Ravindra Dave was inspired by this film.

References

External links

 
 
 
 
 
 Joseph M. Majczek legal case at Northwestern University School of Law
 
 More follow-up on Call Northside 777

Streaming audio
 Call Northside 777 on Screen Guild Theater: October 7, 1948
 Call Northside 777 on Hollywood Sound Stage: December 27, 1951

1940s American films
1940s English-language films
1948 films
1948 crime drama films
20th Century Fox films
American black-and-white films
American crime drama films
American docudrama films
Drama films based on actual events
Edgar Award-winning works
Fictional portrayals of the Chicago Police Department
Film noir
Films about journalists
Films about miscarriage of justice
Films based on newspaper and magazine articles
Films directed by Henry Hathaway
Films scored by Alfred Newman
Films set in 1932
Films set in 1933
Films set in 1944
Films set in Chicago
Films shot in Chicago
Procedural films